Lloyd Curtis Maitland (born 21 March 1957 in Coleshill, Warwickshire) is a former professional footballer, who played for Huddersfield Town and Darlington.

Lloyd, a winger, was the first black player to play for Huddersfield Town's first team in 1975. He also played in Town's FA Youth Cup Final team versus Tottenham Hotspur in 1974.

References

1957 births
Living people
English footballers
People from Coleshill, Warwickshire
Association football midfielders
English Football League players
Huddersfield Town A.F.C. players
Darlington F.C. players
Footballers from Warwickshire